An address is a collection of information, presented in a mostly fixed format, used to give the location of a building, apartment, or other structure or a plot of land, generally using political boundaries and street names as references, along with other identifiers such as house or apartment numbers and organization name. Some addresses also contain special codes, such as a postal code, to make identification easier and aid in the routing of mail.

Addresses provide a means of physically locating a building.  They are used in identifying buildings as the end points of a postal system and as parameters in statistics collection, especially in census-taking and the insurance industry.
Address formats are different in different places, and unlike latitude and longitude coordinates, there is no simple mapping from an address to a location.

History 

Until the 18th and 19th centuries, most houses and buildings were not numbered.
Street naming and numbering began under the age of Enlightenment, also as part of campaigns for census and military conscription, such as in the dominions of Maria Theresa in the mid 18th century.
Numbering allowed the efficient delivery of mail, as the postal system evolved in the 18th and 19th centuries to reach widespread usage.

Comprehensive addressing of all buildings is still incomplete, even in developed countries. For example, the Navajo Nation in the United States was still assigning rural addresses as of 2015 and the lack of addresses can be used for voter disenfranchisement in the USA. In many cities in Asia, most minor streets were never named, and this is still the case today in much of Japan. A third of houses in Ireland lacked unique numbers until the introduction of Eircode in 2014.

Current addressing schemes

House numbering or naming 

In most English-speaking countries, the usual method of house numbering is an alternating numbering scheme progressing in each direction along a street, with odd numbers on one side (often west or south or the left-hand side leading away from a main road) and even numbers on the other side, although there is significant variation on this basic pattern. Many older towns and cities in the UK have "up and down" numbering where the numbers progress sequentially along one side of the road, and then sequentially back down the other side. Cities in North America, particularly those planned on a grid plan, often incorporate block numbers, quadrants (explained below), and cardinal directions into their street numbers, so that in many such cities, addresses roughly follow a Cartesian coordinate system. Some other cities around the world have their own schemes.

Although house numbering is the principal identification scheme in many parts of the world, it is also common for houses in the United Kingdom and Ireland to be identified by name, rather than number, especially in villages. In these cases, the street name will usually follow the house name. Such an address might read: "Smith Cottage, Frog Lane, Barchester, Barsetshire, BZ9 9BA" or "Dunroamin, Emo, Co. Laois, Ireland" (fictional examples).

Quadrants 

In cities with Cartesian-coordinate-based addressing systems, the streets that form the north–south and east–west dividing lines constitute the x and y axes of a Cartesian coordinate plane and thus divide the city into quadrants. The quadrants are typically identified in the street names, although the manner of doing so varies from city to city. For example, in one city, all streets in the northeast quadrant may have "NE" prefixed or suffixed to their street names, while in another, the intersection of North Calvert Street and East 27th Street can be only in the northeast quadrant.

Street-naming conventions 

Street names may follow a variety of themes. In many North American cities, such as San Francisco, USA, and Edmonton, Alberta and Vancouver, British Columbia, streets are simply numbered sequentially across the street grid. Numbered streets originated in the United States in Philadelphia by Thomas Holme who laid out the original plan for the city in 1683. Washington, D.C. has its numbered streets running north–south and lettered or alphabetically named streets running east–west, while diagonal avenues are typically named after states. In Salt Lake City, and many other Utah cities, streets are in a large grid and are numbered in increments of 100 based on their location relative to the center of the city in blocks. A similar system is in use in Detroit with the Mile Road System. In some housing developments in North America and elsewhere, street names may all follow the same theme (for example, bird species), or start with the same letter. Streets in Continental Europe, the Middle East, and Latin America are often named after famous people or significant dates.

Postal codes 

Postal codes are a relatively recent development in addressing, designed to speed the sorting and processing of mail by assigning unique numeric or alphanumeric codes to each geographical locality.

Postal alternatives to physical addresses 

For privacy and other purposes, postal services have made it possible to receive mail without revealing one's physical address or even having a fixed physical address.  Examples are post office boxes, service addresses and poste restante (general delivery).

Address format 

In most of the world, addresses are written in order from most specific to general, i.e. finest to coarsest information, starting with the addressee and ending with the largest geographical unit. For example:

In English-speaking countries, the postal code usually comes last. In much of Europe, the code precedes the town name, thus: "1010 Lausanne". Sometimes, the ISO 3166 country code is placed in front of the postal code: "CH-1010 Lausanne".

If a house number is provided, it is written on the same line as the street name; a house name is written on the previous line. When addresses are written inline, line breaks are replaced by commas. Conventions on the placing of house numbers differ: either before or after the street name. Similarly, there are differences in the placement of postal codes: in the UK, they are written on a separate line at the end of the address; in Australia, Canada and the United States, they usually appear immediately after the state or province, on the same line; in Austria, Belgium, France, Germany and The Netherlands they appear before the city, on the same line.

East Asian addressing systems, including Chinese, Japanese, Korean, and Taiwanese addressing systems, when written in their native scripts, use the opposite ordering, starting with the province/prefecture, ending with the addressee. However both have the same order as western countries when written in the Latin alphabet. The Hungarian system also goes from large to small units, except that the name of the addressee is put into the first line.

The Universal Postal Convention strongly recommends the following:

"The addressee's address shall be worded in a precise and complete manner. It shall be written very legibly in roman letters and Arabic numerals. If other letters and numerals are used in the country of destination, it shall be recommended that the address be given also in these letters and numerals. The name of the place of destination and the name of the country of destination shall be written in capital letters together with the correct postcode number or delivery zone number or post office box number, if any. The name of the country of destination shall be written preferably in the language of the country of origin. To avoid any difficulty in the countries of transit, it is desirable for the name of the country of destination to be added in an internationally known language. Designated operators may recommend that, on items addressed to countries where the recommended position of the postcode is in front of the name of the location of destination, the postcode should be preceded by the EN ISO 3166–1 Alpha 2 country code followed by a hyphen. This shall in no way detract from the requirement for the name of the destination country to be printed in full."

Format by country and area

Argentina 
In Argentina, an address must be mailed this way:

The postal code has been changed from a four digit format to an eight digit format, which is shown in the example. The new format adds a district or province letter code at the beginning, which allows it to be identified. As the system has been changed recently, the four digit format can still be used: in that case it is necessary to add the name of the province or district.

Australia 

In common with the rest of the English-speaking world, addresses in Australia put the street number—which may be a range—before the street name, and the placename before the postcode. Unlike addresses in most other comparable places, the city is not included in the address, but rather a much more fine-grained locality is used, usually referred to in Australia as a suburb or locality – although these words are understood in a different way than in other countries. Because the suburb or town serves to locate the street or delivery type, the postcode serves only as routing information rather than to distinguish previous other parts of an address. As an example, there are around 8000 localities in Victoria (cf. List of localities in Victoria (Australia) and List of Melbourne suburbs), yet around 700 unique geographic postcodes. For certain large volume receivers or post offices, the "locality" may be an institution or street name. It is always considered incorrect to include the city or metropolis name in an address (unless this happens to be the name of the suburb), and doing so may delay delivery.

Australia Post recommends that the last line of the address should be set in capital letters. In Australia, subunits are essential and should be separated from the street by two spaces; apartments, flats and units are typically separated with a forward slash (/) instead.

Apartment, flat and unit numbers, if necessary, are shown immediately prior to the street number (which might be a range), and, as noted above, are separated from the street number by a forward slash. These conventions can cause confusion. To clarify, 3/17 Adam Street would mean Apartment 3 (before the slash) at 17 Adam Street (in the case of a residential address) or Unit 3 at 17 Adam St (in the case of a business park). On the other hand, 3–17 Adam Street would specify a large building (or cluster of related buildings) occupying the lots spanning street numbers 3 to 17 on one side of Adam St (without specifying any particular place within the buildings). These forms can be combined, so 3/5–9 Eve Street signifies Apartment 3 (before the slash) in a building which spans street numbers 5 to 9 on one side of Eve Street.

As in the US, the state/territory is crucial information as many placenames are reused in different states/territories; it is usually separated from the suburb with two spaces and abbreviated. In printed matter, the postcode follows after two spaces; in handwritten matter, the postcode should be written in the boxes provided.

In addition to PO Boxes, other delivery types (which are typically abbreviated) may include:

Australian Post Addressing Guidelines

In rural areas, "Property numbers are worked out based on the distance from the start of the road to the entrance of the property. That distance (in metres) is divided by ten. Even numbers are on the right and odd numbers are on the left. For example: the entrance to a property 5,080 metres from the start of the road on the right hand side becomes number 508. The start of the road is determined as the fastest and safest road accessed from the nearest major road or town. Rural road maps are being drawn up to define the name, the start point and direction of every rural road."

Austria 
In Austria, the address is generally formatted as follows:

The postal code always consists of four digits.

Bangladesh 
In Bangladesh, the format used for rural and urban addresses is different.

Urban Addresses

The postal code always consists of four digits.

Rural Addresses

Belarus 
In Belarus, Some neighbourhoods may be planned in such a way that some, or most, apartment buildings don't face a named street. In this case, a number of expedients can be used. In older neighbourhoods, a "main" building may have the same number as one or more "subsidiary" buildings accessible via driveways behind the main building. They will be addressed as vul. Lenina, d. 123 (123 Lenin St) An address may also cover one or more subsidiary buildings behind the main building, addressed as vul. Lenina, d. 123, bud. 2 (123 Lenin St, unit 2, where bud. (abbreviation for ) means a '(subsidiary) building'). In newer areas with more regular street plans, apartment buildings that do not face a named street may be designated with Cyrillic letters appended to the building number, e.g. 123-а, 123-б, etc., in Cyrillic alphabetical order.

In some microraion neighbourhoods, with few, if any, buildings facing named streets, the name (or more likely number of the microraion (planned housing development)) would be used instead of the street name; thus someone may live at 4-th microrayon, d. 123, kv. 56, i.e. 123 - 4th Microraion, apt. 56.

Source: Belposhta

Belgium 
In Belgium, the address starts with the most specific information (addressee individual identification) and ends with the most general information (postcode and town for domestic mail or country for cross border mail.)
Spatial information of a physical address (including building, wing, stairwell, floor and door) may be useful for internal path of delivery, but is not allowed in the delivery point location line (i.e. the line containing street, number and box number). If needed, this information will appear on a line above the delivery point location line.

The street number is placed after the thoroughfare name (unlike in France), separated by a space. Separators such as punctuation (point, comma or other signs) or "nº", or "nr" are not allowed. Extension designation (box numbers), if present, appears in the delivery point location line, preceded by the word for "box" ( in Dutch,  in French). Symbols such as b, Bt, #, -, / are not allowed as separators between the street number element and the box number element.

Examples of a correctly formatted postal address:

The Belgian addressing guidelines are registered with the Universal Postal Union (UPU and see the link Universal Postal Union – Postal addressing systems in member countries). These guidelines indicate exactly how to combine the various address components in order to obtain a correctly formatted postal address.

The complete set of addressing guidelines can be found on the website of the Belgian postal operator (bpost). The correct representation of an address is not limited to the correct structure of address components but also relates to the content of addresses and their position on envelopes (see bpost - Lettres & cartes - Envoi - Comment addresser ? (in French)).
 
It is also possible to validate a Belgian postal address on bpost's website and to receive feedback on the content and the format of an address.

Brazil 
In Brazil, an address must be written this way:

States can have their name written in full, abbreviated in some way, or totally abbreviated to two letters (SP = São Paulo, RJ = Rio de Janeiro, etc.).

Only towns with 60,000 inhabitants and above have postal codes individualized for streets, roads, avenues, etc. One street can have several postal codes (by odd/even numbers side or by segment). These postcodes range from -000 to -899. Other towns have only a generic postcode with the suffix -000. Recipients of bulk mail (large companies, condos, etc.) have specific postcodes, with a suffix ranging from -900 to -959. P.O. boxes are mailed to  offices, with suffixes ranging from -970 to -979. Some rural settlements have community postboxes with suffix -990.

Bulgaria 
Similar to Belgium and most other European countries, in Bulgaria the address starts with the most specific information (addressee individual identification) and ends with the most general information (town and postcode for domestic mail or country for cross border (international) mail.)
Spatial information of a physical address (including building, wing, stairwell, floor and door) may be useful for internal path of delivery, but is not allowed in the delivery point location line (i.e. the line containing street, number and box number). If needed, this information will appear on a line above the delivery point location line.

The street number is placed after the thoroughfare name (unlike in France), separated by a space and the symbol 'No. '. Separators such as punctuation (point, comma or other signs) are allowed if needed. Extension designation (box numbers), if present, appears in the delivery point location line, preceded by the word for "box" (" {numeral}", " {numeral}", or " {numeral}"). Symbols such as #, -, / are not strictly disallowed as separators between the street number element and the box number element.

The convention is that the addressee's information is written on the bottom right portion of the letter. The sender's information is written either on the top left portion of the letter or on the top reverse side of the letter (except for parcel packages).
 
Domestic post letters, parcels and postal money transfers are written in Bulgarian Cyrillic while the international postal letters and parcels are written in the Latin script (usually in English due to its global usage) with Arabic numerals.

Apart delivering mail and parcel packages to individual addresses, the Bulgarian Posts also delivers to local post offices (which then notify the recipient that he/she has mail to collect from the post office; so-called  (letters on demand/request)) or to a subscription mailbox within a local post office.

Examples of a correctly formatted postal address:

Format for mail exchange between private individuals:

Format for mail and parcel exchange between business partners:

Format for mail and parcel sending to an individual subscription mailbox within a local office of Bulgarian Posts:

The Bulgarian postal addressing guidelines are registered with the Universal Postal Union (UPU and see the link Universal Postal Union – Postal addressing systems in member countries). These guidelines indicate exactly how to combine the various address components in order to obtain a correctly formatted postal address.

The complete set of addressing guidelines can be found on the website of the Bulgarian postal operator (Bulgarian Posts). The correct representation of an address is not limited to the correct structure of address components but also relates to the content of addresses and their position on envelopes (see Български пощи ( Български пощи ) (in Bulgarian)).
 
It is also possible to validate a Bulgarian postal address on Bulgarian Posts' website and to receive feedback on the content and the format of an address. More information can be found at (see Български пощи (in Bulgarian)).

Canada 
Addressing guidelines can differ between English- and French-speaking populations in Canada. Here are some formatting rules that are used in common:

 Cardinal directions like North, North West, etc. can be abbreviated in either English or French, and appear after the street name. Ordinal numbered streets (e.g. 6th, 2nd) can be written in either English or French.
 If there is an apartment number it should be written before the house number and separated by a hyphen. 
 Name of city or town followed by two letter provincial abbreviations
 Postal codes come in a letter-number-letter-space-number-letter-number format, for example: A1A 1A1. There should be two spaces between the province abbreviation and the postal code.
 If sending a parcel from outside Canada, the word "CANADA" must be placed at the very bottom.

See the example below for a comparison of the English and French address formats:

English (from Canada Post):
 NICOLE MARTIN
 123 SHERBROOKE ST
 TORONTO ON L3R 9P6

French (from the OQLF):
 Monsieur Jean-Pierre Lamarre
 101–3485, rue de la Montagne
 Montréal (Québec)  H3G 2A6

 See Canada Post's Addressing Guidelines for accurate, up-to-date information on the addressing guidelines most commonly used in Canada.
 See the Office québécois de la langue française's Adressage webpage (in French only) for more information about how to write an address according to guidelines used in Quebec and other French-speaking areas.

Chile 
Chilean urban addresses require only the street name, house number, apartment number (if necessary) and municipality; however, more information is frequently included, such as commune (neighbourhood or town) and region. Postal codes are rarely included by people. All postal codes have seven digits, the first three indicating the municipality, the next four identifying a block or in large and scarcely populated areas a quadrant within the municipal territory.

The territories of most of the larger cities comprise several adjacent municipalities, so it is important to mention it.

Smaller cities often consist of only one municipality with several unofficial comunes (neighborhoods) that are usually mentioned even for official addressing purposes.

Several large and mostly rural municipalities contain more than one small town, in such cases, the recipient address must mention either the town, the postal code or both.

In other towns or rural communities there are no house numbers and addresses are generally identified by company name followed by only a street name follow by some reference point.

China 
In China, the Postal area when written in Chinese characters (preferably Simplified Chinese characters), has the order of the largest unit first, ending with the addressee, i.e. country, province, municipality, town, street or road, building name, floor/level, house/flat number, company name, addressee. This is the most common language used when posting within mainland China.

The whole address is commonly written as a string of characters with no particular format regarding where a new line would start, similar to one long sentence, with any new lines appearing depending on the space available on the envelope. Generally, the district is omitted when posting within China.

Colombia 

Croatia 
Croatian Post recommends the following format:

Croatia uses five-digit postal code numbers. The Croatian postal service recommends using 2-letter ISO country codes as prefixes before international and domestic postal codes, though the practice is not mandatory.

Czech Republic 
Common format in the Czech Republic:

Postal codes are in the format "### ##" (i.e. 158 00 = Prague 58) or "CZ-#####" (especially for international mail). On pre-printed Czech postcards and envelopes, the postal code is written on a separate last row in boxes for each number. If the envelope doesn't have pre-printed rows and boxes, the postal code should be before the town (or post office) name.

On private letters, the first line is usually constituted by a courtesy title (...) For private mails addressed to the workplace, the order is (name + company), while in official mails it is (company + name).

The basic system of house numbering uses conscription house numbers. In most larger cities and also in some towns and large villages with street names, there is a double system of house numbering. The first number is the conscription or evidentional number (which corresponds to the chronological order of cadastral registration of the house), and the second number (after a slash) is the orientational number which expresses the position in the street. Sometimes only one of the two numbers is used, or the numbers are used in reverse order, and it can be difficult to distinguish which number is which. Generally, orientation numbers (if they exist) are preferred for mail services.

How to correctly address mail

Denmark 

In Denmark, apartment buildings will usually have two or three apartments per floor.

Also, for postal codes 2000 and up, there is a 1:1 relationship between postal code and town.

Estonia 
In Estonia, use the following format.

Finland 

In Finland, if a person's name is written before the company name in the address field of a letter, then that person is considered the recipient. In this case, no other employee is allowed to open the letter but the indicated recipient. If the company name is before the person's name, then the company is the recipient and any employee is allowed to open the letter.

Finland uses a five-digit postal code. Note that some larger companies and organizations have their own postal codes.

France 

In France, the address is generally formatted as follows:

The postal code always consists of five digits. The  is usually a town, but may be other territorial entities (up to a )

Organisations, government agencies, and companies which receive large amounts of mail often have a special CEDEX address which goes after the last line (for instance, "75001 PARIS CEDEX").

Germany 
In Germany, the address is generally formatted as follows:

 The postal code always consists of five digits.
 Organizations that receive large amounts of mail may be assigned a bulk customer postal code. These are different from regular postal codes in that they do not have a street name line. Some bulk customer postal codes are shared between several organizations.
 There are a few places that have house numbers but no street names (e.g. Baltrum) as well as addresses that have a street name but no house number.
 Some (but not all) private post companies are also able to deliver to Deutsche Post-operated P.O. boxes.
 Post codes follow the structure of DPAG's mail routing, not administrative boundaries.
 Each post code is used exclusively for street addresses, P.O. boxes or bulk recipients.
 Sub-building information, such as apartment numbers, is rarely used—a name on the post box is usually the only method of identification of an addressee within a building.

Greece 
Hellenic Post recommends the following format for Greek addresses:

The most widespread format, shown above, gives on the last line the recipient's five-digit post code (with a single space between the third and fourth digits) and the name of the town or village that is the base of a post office, in capital letters and separated from the postcode by two spaces. When sending mail abroad, or when sending mail from abroad to Greece, Hellenic Post recommends the following format:

As with domestic mail, mail sent from abroad must contain the postcode in the same manner, but the postcode must be preceded by the international prefix of the country of delivery (for Greece, GR). Below the destination, the country of delivery must be written in capital letters, either in English or French (for Greece,  or GREECE).

Hong Kong 
The official languages of Hong Kong are Chinese and English. For domestic mail within Hong Kong, the address may be written entirely in either Chinese or English. For overseas mail going out from Hong Kong, the address may be written in the language of the destination country, provided that the city name and the country name are in English. However, for an overseas mail from Hong Kong to Mainland China, Macao, Taiwan or Singapore, the address may be written entirely in Chinese. While traditional Chinese characters are commonly used in Hong Kong, simplified Chinese characters are also understood by Hong Kong's postmen. Note that Hong Kong does not use any postal codes, though many rural properties have a property identification code, e.g. HKT-12345.

An address written in English should begin with the smallest unit and end with the largest unit, as in the following example for a domestic mail within Hong Kong.

An address written in Chinese should begin with the largest unit and end with the smallest unit, as in the following example for a piece of domestic mail within Hong Kong. Traditional Chinese characters are used in this example.

For mail to Hong Kong from overseas, "Hong Kong" should be added at the end of an address written in English, and  should be added at the beginning of an address written in Chinese.

Hungary 
In Hungarian mail addresses, the city/town name precedes the street address. The post code then comes after the street address.

Hungarian family names precede given names in Hungarian.  In this example,  is the family name.

Sometimes a district number might appear after the name of the city/town.

The postal code consists of four digits.

Iceland 

In Iceland, the following format is used.

India 
In India, multiple formats are used.

General Address

The format used for rural and urban addresses is different.

Rural Addresses

Urban Addresses

The state is optional in both cases, but is typically used.

Indonesia 
In Indonesia, the address format is as follows:

Generally  or  means 'street' and should be written before the street name, e.g. . For more about Indonesian administrative divisions, see administrative divisions of Indonesia.

Iran 
Postal addresses in Iran have a standard which should be used by mail or parcel senders. This standard is registered and qualified by the Universal Postal Union (UPU). According to the below table, Iran has 4 types of standard address:

Iraq 
In Iraq, the following format is used:

Ireland 

In July 2015, the Republic of Ireland introduced Eircodes, a seven digit alphanumeric code, consisting of a 3 character routing key and a 4 character unique identifier for the property. Example A65 F4E2. Up until the introduction of Eircodes Dublin was the only county with a form of postal district identifier; these have been incorporated into the Eircode scheme. For example, Dublin 2 is routing code D02.

Rural addresses are specified by the county, nearest post town, and the townland. Urban addresses are specified by county, city or town name, street name, house number, and apartment or flat number where relevant. A house name may be used instead of a number. The Eircode is appended to the bottom of the address.

Israel 
In Israel, the Universal Postal Union recommends the following:

In apartment buildings the building number should appear first and then the apartment number separated by a "/". In the below example, "16" is the building number while "20" is the apartment number:

Example of common address with building entrance and apartment number:

Or

A seven digit postal code for all addresses was introduced in 2013 which can cover an entire locality for a small town or village. In bigger cities postal areas are divided along streets and neighbourhoods.

Italy 
A domestic address in Italy must be composed of three to five rows. Up to six rows can be used for international mail:

Line ordering may not be changed.

Japan 

A Japanese postal address, when written in Japanese phonetic and Chinese characters, starts with the largest geographical division, continues with progressively smaller subdivisions before ending with the addressee, i.e. country, prefecture, town, building number, building name, floor number, company name, addressee. This is the most common addressing format used when mailing within Japan.

When written in the Latin alphabet, the address begins with the smallest geographical area and ends with the largest one as in the Anglicized example in the table. Macrons (as on ō and ū) may be omitted.

Japanese-style envelopes are vertically aligned and the address is written from top to bottom, then right to left. Western-style envelopes are horizontally aligned and the address is written from left to right, top to bottom.

Latvia 
In Latvia, the address is generally formatted as follows:

Notes:

 Each address element should be written on a separate line, starting with the more detailed element.
 Including the addressee's name is not mandatory and the address can be considered complete without it.
 In Latvian, the addressee's name should be provided in the dative case, i.e., .
 Indicate the full street name, house and flat number (if applicable). Separate house and flat number with a hyphen.
 It is acceptable to abbreviate the parish (abbreviation of ) and amalgamated municipality (abbreviation of ).
 The postal code consists of two capital letters (LV) and four digits separated with a hyphen.
 For international mail the destination country must be indicated in block letters.

Further reference: Latvijas Pasts

Macao 
The official languages of Macao are Cantonese and Portuguese. For domestic mail within Macau, the address may be written entirely in either Portuguese or Chinese. For overseas mail going out from Macau, the address may be written in the language of the destination country, provided that the city name and the country name are in English. However, for overseas mail from Macau to mainland China, Hong Kong, Taiwan or Singapore, the address may be written entirely in Chinese. While traditional Chinese characters are commonly used in Macau, simplified Chinese characters are also understood by Macau's postmen. Note that Macau does not use any postal codes.

An address written in Portuguese should begin with the street name and end with the area in Macau, as in the following example for domestic mail within Macau.

An address written in Chinese should begin with the largest unit and end with the smallest unit, as in the following example for a piece of domestic mail within Macau. Traditional Chinese characters are used in this example.

For mail to Macau from overseas, "Macau" should be added at the end of an address written in Portuguese, and "Macao" at the end of an address written in English;  should be added at the beginning of an address written in Chinese.

Malaysia 

Pos Malaysia recommends the following formats:

Notes:

 The Country line MALAYSIA is always omitted when mailing from within Malaysia.
 The State line is strictly optional, the mailing system will not be affected if the State line is omitted.
 The Post office/Mail centre field is the name of the town/city which post office/mail centre jurisdiction covers the mailing address, and in several cases, may not be the actual town/city which the address is geographically located.
 It is recommended to have the Post office/Mail centre written in block letters, e.g. KUALA LUMPUR.
 The postcode is always in the 5-digit format and must correspond to the respective post office / mail centre. 
 Pos Malaysia allows usage of P.O. Box for both residential and business addresses. Whenever a P.O. Box address is used, its respective postcode and post office/mail centre must be written on the last line of an address. If both postcodes are present (original and P.O. Box), mail will be sent to the P.O. Box on its first attempt.

Mexico 
In Mexico, Correos de México recommends the following formats:

Netherlands 
In the Netherlands, the address is generally formatted as follows:

The postal code is a unique street identifier, and always consists of four numbers followed by a space and then two capital letters. PostNL, which is appointed by the Dutch government to carry out the UPD (Dutch for Universal Postal Service), recommends putting two spaces between postal code and town. Also, the name of the town should be written in capitals.

Because the Dutch postal code uniquely identifies a street, a shortened format may also be used. This method only needs the postal code and the number. The ideal format for this method is the number after the postal code, meaning that this: '5631 AV 1092' will still get the letter delivered to the correct location.

It is also possible to replace the street name line with a PO box (e.g. "postbus 1200") or freepost number (e.g. "antwoordnummer 150"), which have their own postal code.

New Zealand 

In New Zealand, New Zealand Post recommends the following format:

Note that no space or full stops exists between P and O in PO Box or R and D in RD. One should put only one space between the town/city and the postcode.

Note for Wellington metropolitan area, users should use the city name (i.e. Wellington, Lower Hutt, Upper Hutt, Porirua), not the metropolitan area name. For example:

The city in this case is important, as if Wellington is used instead of Lower Hutt and the postcode is unclear (note only the first digit differs), someone's private mail could accidentally be sent to the New Zealand Parliament Buildings instead (or vice versa).

One anomaly about this system is the Wellington Mail Centre, which is addressed as Wellington Mail Centre, Lower Hutt 5045, due to its location in the Lower Hutt suburb of Petone.

Norway 
Postal addresses in Norway are formatted as follows:

The first line, Recipient (Person or Entity), is the legal recipient of the item being sent. The Recipient's name must be marked on the mail box in order for the item to be delivered.

Flat or floor number is not part of Norwegian postal addresses.

The postal code (always four digits) is mandatory. If a PO box is used (e.g. Postboks 250 Sentrum), it replaces Street name + Number. PO box addresses have postal codes which differ from those used for street addresses. Some areas do not have street names. For these areas, Street name + Number is replaced by a local designation determined by the Norwegian postal service.

Oman 
In the Sultanate of Oman (2012), the address is formatted as follows:

Physical addresses only exist in major urban centers like those of Greater Muscat, Sohar, Salalah, Sur and Nizwa.

Pakistan 
The format used in the Islamic Republic of Pakistan.

Official Addresses

Peru 
In Peru, addresses in the Metropolitan Area of Lima and Callao are generally formatted as follows:

Addresses elsewhere in the country are formatted as follows:

Philippines 

The Philippines follows Western conventions on addressing. Addresses in the Philippines either uses these formats.

Poland 
In Poland, the address is generally formatted as follows:

ul. = Str (Street)
al. = Ave (Avenue)
pl. = Sq (Square, or Circus)

Some streets have names not containing the word "street". Then the full description is written with initial caps, e.g. "Zaułek Marii" (Court of Mary) or "Aleje Ujazdowskie" (plural for Ujazdowskie Ave.). If the first word of name is "Aleje" it may be abbreviated to "Al." (with initial capital).

The abbreviation "m." (meaning "mieszkanie" = "flat") can be used instead of "/" before the flat number.

Some large buildings occupy two or more cadastral plots. Sometimes to maintain consistency all numbers are included in address. The very well-known example is the address of Polish Radio Three: "ul. Myśliwiecka 3/5/7" (occupying three neighbouring plots). In examples like in above table the number "4/6" is ambiguous and not knowing the locality you cannot tell if "6" is the apartment number or the building is large.

When using a p.o. box the abbreviation "skr. poczt." may be used and "nr" (no.) may be omitted. Polish Post allows the box user to register an alias for their name. In such case it is written instead of the real name of the recipient. It is required to write the full name of post office including a number if it exists.

The postal code always consists of five digits separated with a hyphen (in the "XX-XXX" format), i.e. 00-486 (00 = Warsaw); 20-486 (20 = Lublin), etc. The first digit signifies the postal district, the second: the code zone, the third: the code sector, the fourth and fifth signify the post office and its area of operation. Usually the code is unique on the street level for cities and the town level for smaller towns and villages. Contrary to popular belief the name after postal code is a locality of addressee, not their post office. So if a small town has no street names you do write its name twice. The post office location (and a number if there are many) is written only on letters to p.o. box or poste restante.

There is a strong recommendation to use all caps in the line with postal code and city.

Portugal 
Portuguese postal addresses is similar to continental European addresses:

Postal codes have the NNNN-NNN format. Street name and the number is traditionally separated by a comma, but nowadays CTT recommends just a blank space, or two blank spaces for extra clarity; this is to avoid OCR mistakes. The º after the number is the ordinal for floor number. Usually followed by "Esq." (Left, abbr from "Esquerdo") or "Dir." (Right, abbr from "Direito"), or an apartment letter (A, B, C, etc.). PO Boxes are called Apartado, followed by a number (e.g., Apartado 1001).

Qatar 
In Qatar, Q-Post recommends the following format:

Not all of Qatar's roads and buildings are numbered, Q-Post doesn't deliver to any street addresses, and no postal codes are used in Qatar.

Romania 
In Romania, the address is generally formatted as follows:

 According to NACREP - National agency for cadastral and real estate publicity (in Romanian ANCPI - Agenția Națională de Cadastru și publicitate imobiliară) in Romania there are 29 street types such as:

Russia 
In Russia, the address must be written in Cyrillic or Latin alphabet, in usual format (from most specific to general).

Example:

Note: sub-region and region/oblast names are void if the city is Moscow or Saint Petersburg or if it is sub-region administrative center.

Some neighbourhoods may be planned in such a way that some, or most, apartment buildings face no named street. In this case, a number of expedients can be used. In older neighbourhoods, such as the historical center of Moscow, a "main" building may have the same number as one or more "subsidiary" buildings accessible via driveways behind the main building. They will be addressed as, for example, ul. Lenina, d. 123 (that is, 123 Lenin St). An address may also cover one or more subsidiary buildings behind the main building, addressed as ul. Lenina, d. 123, str. 2 (123 Lenin St, Unit 2, where str. (abbreviation for строение, stroenie) means a 'subsidiary building'). In newer  areas with more regular street plans, apartment buildings that face no named street may be designated with Cyrillic letters appended to the building number, such as 123-а, 123-б, etc., in alphabetic order.

In some microraion neighbourhoods, with few, if any, buildings facing named streets, the name (or more likely number of the microraion (planned housing development)) would be used instead of the street name; thus someone may live at 4-th microrayon, d. 123, kv. 56, that is, 123 - 4th Microraion, apt. 56.

Saudi Arabia 
In Saudi Arabia, the address could be written in Arabic or English in the following format:

Serbia 
Serbian postal addresses conform to rules similar to continental European rules:

In addition to 5-digit postal code, another line can be added containing PAK, a six-digit number which encodes the town, street and house number section.

Singapore 
In Singapore, SingPost recommends the following format for addresses:

Generally, the last line SINGAPORE is omitted when posting within the country. Addresses are usually written in the English language.

Slovakia 
Common format in Slovakia:

Postal codes are in the format "### ##" (i.e. 851 01 = Bratislava 5).

Street numbers can be written as orientation numbers (related to street) or descriptive numbers (unique within the town) or as a combination separated by a slash (descriptive/orientation). Descriptive numbers are also used within small villages that do not have named streets.

If the delivery is intended exclusively for a specific person at a company site, the address should begin with the individual's name and the company name should follow. The standard format of addresses enables anyone at the company to receive the delivery.

http://www.posta.sk/potrebujem/spravne-napisat-adresu ("How to write addresses correctly", in Slovak, with pictures)

Slovenia 
Slovenia uses a four-digit postal number. The first digit indicates the area:

1xxx for Ljubljana
2xxx for Maribor
3xxx for Celje
4xxx for Kranj
5xxx for Nova Gorica
6xxx for Koper
7xxx not used
8xxx for Novo Mesto
9xxx for Murska Sobota

The simpler the code, the bigger the locality: 1000 Ljubljana, 2000 Maribor (big cities); 1310 Ribnica, 9250 Gornja Radgona (mid-sized towns); 4263 Bohinjska Bela, 8262 Krška vas (smaller settlements, including villages).

Some cities have more than one post office, thus having multiple postcodes (usually in the x1xx format). For example, Ljubljana which has a "general" postcode 1000, also has additional ones, ranging from 1101 to 1133 (for some reason, however, omitting 1103 and 1105), Kamnik has 1240 and 1241, etc. Albeit they exist, it is not necessary to use them - usually the "general" postcodes are used.

The abbreviations are: g. for gospod (Mr), ga. for gospa (Mrs), and gdč. for gospodična (Miss) - all always capitalized if in the beginning of the line.

Numbers can have a suffix like A, B, C, etc.

Common abbreviations are: c. for cesta (Street), and ul. for ulica (Road) - both always capitalised if in the beginning of the line.

 Bigger towns have special postcodes for PO Boxes in the xxx1 format, e.g. 1001 Ljubljana, 4001 Kranj.

 Big companies which receive large amounts of mail are designated their special postcodes in the x5xx format.

South Korea 

South Korea uses a system similar to Western addressing, but previously used a system similar to Japanese addressing. South Korean addresses start with the largest unit (country, province), as with other East Asian countries.

Spain 
In Spain, the addresses are generally formatted as follows:

5ºB means 5th floor (Spanish: quinto), door B. Also, there may be door number, printed as 1ª (primera-first). Suffixes "o" and "a" derives from Spanish words piso (floor) which is masculine and puerta (door) which is feminine.

Some doors may be indicated with the abbreviations Izq. or Dcha., to indicate either left (Izquierda) or right (Derecha). Streets and avenues can be indicated with the abbreviations C. (for calle) and Av. (for avenida).

Sri Lanka 
Sri Lanka Post recommends the following format:

Sri Lanka uses a five-digit postal code. Generally, the last line SRI LANKA is omitted when posting within the country. Addresses are usually written in English and Sinhala.

Sweden 
In Sweden, the address is generally formatted as follows:

The postal code is always a five-digit number divided into groups of three and two (e.g. SE-414 73) with the prefix SE (ISO-code for Sweden) used only if sent from abroad. It is also possible to replace the street name line with a PO box (e.g. Box 51).

Switzerland 
In Switzerland, the address is generally formatted as follows:

The canton abbreviation (SO, VD in the examples) is needed only for cities/town that have the same name but in another canton for example: Renens and Renan which were both, in the past, called Renens, the difference stays today and Renens is often mentioned as Renens VD.

Taiwan 

In Taiwan, addresses are regulated by the Department of Household Registration, while mails are handled by the Chunghwa Post. As a result, senders are required to write addresses in different formats in different situations.

Thailand 

In Thailand, address are generally formatted as follows:

Turkey 
Turkish addressing system is as follows:

Ukraine 
Some neighbourhoods in Ukraine may be planned in such a way that some, or most, apartment buildings don't face a named street. In this case, a number of expedients can be used. In older neighbourhoods, a "main" building may have the same number as one or more "subsidiary" buildings accessible via driveways behind the main building. They will be addressed as vul. Bandery, d. 123 (123 Bandera St) An address may also cover one or more subsidiary buildings behind the main building, addressed as vul. Bandery, d. 123, bud. 2 (123 Bandera St, unit 2, where bud. (abbreviation for будинок, budynоk) means a '(subsidiary) building'). In newer areas with more regular street plans, apartment buildings that don't face a named street may be designated with Cyrillic letters appended to the building number, e.g. 123-а, 123-б, etc., in Cyrillic alphabetical order.

In some microraion neighbourhoods, with few, if any, buildings facing named streets, the name (or more likely number of the microraion (planned housing development)) would be used instead of the street name; thus someone may live at 4-th microrayon, bud. 123, kv. 56, i.e. 123 - 4th Microraion, apt. 56.

United Arab Emirates 
In the United Arab Emirates, Emirates Post Group recommends the following format:

Not all of the roads and buildings in the UAE are numbered consistently and no postal codes are used in the United Arab Emirates. All mail by post are delivered only to PO boxes in the United Arab Emirates. If delivering to a street address it is customary to include recipient's telephone number should the delivery driver need to make a phone call to ascertain the address or let the recipient know that the package is already delivered.

United Kingdom 

In the United Kingdom, the format specified by the postal operator Royal Mail is as follows:

The locality is required only where its absence would cause ambiguity, for example where a post town or postcode district includes two streets with the same name. Royal Mail specifies that post towns should be written in block capitals. Until 1996 a postal county (or permitted abbreviation) was required after the post town, unless it was a special post town, for example London. The post town and postcode should each be on a separate line. Historically, each line of an address ended with a comma and was indented from the previous line. Royal Mail discourage this usage and specify that all lines should start from the same point and not be staggered or aligned to the centre. The postcode identifies, from left to right, increasingly smaller units of the postal delivery system. The first half of the postcode, known as the outward code, contains the postcode area and postcode district. The second half, known as the inward code, contains the postcode sector and postcode unit.

United States 

In the United States, addresses are generally formatted as follows:

The street address line can take a number of alternate formats:

 "GENERAL DELIVERY" marks the item to be held for pickup from the post office (see )
 Some street names are simply the names of highways, like "KY STATE HIGHWAY 625" (a Kentucky state highway), "INTERSTATE 55 BYP" (an auxiliary Interstate bypass), "FM 1200" (a "farm to market" road) or "LOOP 410".
 In rural areas, mail is addressed according to the mail route rather than the physical street address. The street line might be something like "RR 9 BOX 19-1A" (a "rural route", previously RFD or RD "rural delivery") "HC 68 BOX 23A" for "highway contract" routes (formerly "star routes") The physical street address may appear in the line above the "RR" line without hindering delivery.
 In Hawaii and Southern California, some addresses have a hyphen in the street number, which should not be removed if matched to the ZIP+4 file. All addresses in  the New York City borough of Queens have hyphens, for example "123–45 QUEENS BLVD".
 In Utah, some addresses are given in a grid style, where the "street name" consists of a cardinal direction, a number that is a multiple of 100, and an orthogonal cardinal direction. For example, "401 West 500 North" is on the grid in St. George, Utah, on the road West 500 North between its intersections with North 400 West and North 500 West.
 In Wisconsin and northern Illinois, grid addresses are sometimes written as a sequence of numbers and directional letters, e.g. "N6W23001 BLUEMOUND RD".
 In Puerto Rico, street addresses often include an urbanization or condominium name. The USPS allows for Spanish conventions on the island.
 United States Virgin Islands street addresses sometimes include only an estate name or a street name with no number, and many street names do not have common suffixes like "Street" or "Road".

Notes:

 Traditionally, only the United States Postal Service (USPS) has been permitted to deliver to a P.O. Box. For this reason the recipient may choose to insert their physical (aka street) address in the second line, expanding the complete address to four lines. Providing both allows a sender to ship via the USPS or via a private carrier. Some USPS facilities allow a user of a P.O. box to use the street address of the postal facility with the P.O. box number in the place of a suite number, in which case the user may receive packages from private carriers.
 Mail will be delivered to the line immediately above the city, state, ZIP code line.
 The state and type of street, e.g. Lane, is often abbreviated as shown in the PO standard.
 The USPS discourages the use of all punctuation except the hyphen in ZIP+4 codes, slashes in fractional addresses (e.g. 123 1/2 Main Street), hyphenated street numbers, and periods in decimal addresses (e.g. the street name contains a decimal point). Hyphenated street numbers are common in the New York City borough of Queens, Hawaii, and Southern California; as well as the town of Fair Lawn, New Jersey; see house numbering.
 Sometimes the name of the town required by the United States Postal Service does not necessarily mean that address is within that city. See also ZIP codes and previous zoning lines.
 In some other cases, the boundaries of towns as recognized by the U.S. Postal Service are much smaller than the area within the city limits. For one example, mail to much of the city of Los Angeles cannot be addressed to "Los Angeles".
 The U.S. Postal Service does not recognize "New York City" as a valid postal address. "New York" is a valid postal town only for Manhattan; mail to all of the city's other boroughs must be addressed with the borough name or, in Queens, with a particular neighborhood name associated with the recipient's ZIP Code.
 The USPS prefers that territories be addressed in the standard domestic format (e.g. "San Juan PR00907") but in practice territory names are sometimes written as if they are a country (e.g. "San Juan 00907 Puerto Rico").
 International United States Department of State mail will use "DPO" as the city; military mail will use "APO" or "FPO".  Both use "AE", "AP", or "AA" in place of the state code, depending on the continent.
 Three independent countries with a Compact of Free Association with the U.S. (Palau, the Marshall Islands, and the Federated States of Micronesia) have their own domestic government-run mail services, but are integrated into the USPS addressing and ZIP code system.  (See United States Postal Service#International services.)

Vietnam 
In Vietnam, addresses are generally formatted as follows:

Notes: 
 Name of province is optional for municipalities and provinces which name are the same with their city counterparts.

See also 

Delivery point
Geocode
Handwritten Address Interpretation (HWAI)
Human geography
Japanese addressing system
National Land and Property Gazetteer
service d'adresse mondial (sedamo) or worldwide address service

References

Further reading

External links 

 Frank's compulsive guide to postal addresses
 Universal Postal Union  Postal addressing systems by country
 ISO TC 154 ISO Technical Committee 154 on Processes, data elements and documents in commerce, industry and administration
 United States Postal Service Address Guidelines

Human geography
Postal systems